Signals is a solo album by American guitarist Wayne Krantz that was released in 1990.

Track listing
All songs written by Wayne Krantz, except where noted

 "Alliance"  – 3:37
 "Faith In Process" – 3:52
 "One of Two" – 4:16
 "Don't Tell Me" – 5:29
 "As Is"  – 3:30 (Leni Stern)
 "Signals" – 5:35
 "Sossity, You're a Woman" – 3:32 (Ian Anderson)
 "Music Room" – 4:50
 "Two of Two" – 3:17
 "For Susan" – 3:40

Personnel
 Wayne Krantz – guitar
 Leni Stern – guitar
 Jim Beard – keyboards
 Anthony Jackson – bass guitar
 Dennis Chambers – drums
 Don Alias – percussion
 Hiram Bullock - bass

References

Wayne Krantz albums